San Simeon (Spanish: San Simeón, meaning "St. Simon") is a village and Census-designated place on the Pacific coast of San Luis Obispo County, California, United States. A key feature of the area is Hearst Castle, a hilltop mansion built for William Randolph Hearst in the early 20th century that is now a tourist attraction. The area is also home to an invasive zebra population of slightly over 100.

History 

Humans first settled the local area at least 11,000 years ago.  Prehistorically, the local area was inhabited by the Chumash people, including a large village south of San Simeon at Morro Creek.

In 1542 the coastal exploration of Juan Cabrillo discovered the bay and named it the Bay of Sardines.

The first European land exploration of Alta California, the Spanish Portolà expedition, traveled northwest along the coast in September 1769. On September 11–12, the party passed the future location of San Simeon. At Ragged Point, which is about  past San Simeon, the party turned inland across the Santa Lucia Range.

San Simeon was founded as an asistencia ("sub-mission") to Mission San Miguel Arcángel, founded in 1797 and located to the east across the Santa Lucia Range. The Bay of San Simeon is mentioned in the records of San Miguel Mission for 1830. San Simeon was named for Rancho San Simeon, although the town-site is actually north of that rancho, on the former Rancho Piedra Blanca, a Mexican land grant given in 1840 to José de Jesús Pico. In 1865, Pico sold part of the rancho to George Hearst, the father of William Randolph Hearst.

The first Europeans to settle in the immediate area near the bay of San Simeon were Portuguese shore whalers under the command of Captain Joseph Clark (born Machado) from the Cape Verde Islands, around 1864. In 1869, Captain Clark built a wharf near the point for his whaling station. A small community grew near the 1869 wharf, but the waves near the wharf were too high,  and the wharf was abandoned. In 1878, Hearst built a new wharf,   and the small community moved near the new wharf. A general store (later Sebastian's Store) was built near the Clark wharf, and then relocated near the 1878 wharf. Shore whaling continued on the point until the mid-1890s. It ceased for a short time, started up again in 1897, and continued until about 1908 when it ceased for good.

In 1953, the Hearst Corporation donated the William Randolph Hearst Memorial Beach, including the Hearst Pier, to San Luis Obispo County. It is currently part of Hearst San Simeon State Park. The present-day San Simeon pier was built in 1957.

Geology 
The name San Simeon also refers to some geologic structures of the area, particularly elements of the coastal Jurassic-age landforms and ophiolite rock formations.

Geography 
According to the United States Census Bureau, the census-designated place covers an area of 0.8 square miles (2.1 km2), all of it land. The original townsite of San Simeon is at San Simeon Bay, and was the important 19th-century shipping point with the successive wharves that were built. San Simeon Acres, about 4 mi south of the original townsite at the mouth of Pico Creek, and so about halfway between old San Simeon and Cambria, was established in the 1950s. Most of the development at San Simeon Acres was in the 1960s to the 1980s. Many motels and cafes serve visitors to Hearst Castle.

Climate 
San Simeon and the Hearst Castle area has a warm-summer Mediterranean climate (Köppen csb) that is moderated by its relative proximity to the Pacific coastline.

Demographics 

The 2010 United States Census reported that San Simeon had a population of 462. The racial makeup of San Simeon was 58.4% White, 0.9% African American, 1.1% Native American, 1.9% Asian, 0.4% Pacific Islander, 34.6% from other races, and 2.6% from two or more races. Hispanics or Latinos of any race were 55.8%.

Of the 197 households, 26.9% had children under the age of 18 living in them, 47.7% were married couples living together, 7.1% had a female householder with no husband present 6.6% had a male householder with no wife present, 6.1% were unmarried opposite-sex partnerships, and 2.5% were same-sex married couples or partnerships; 34.0% of the households were made up of individuals, and 15.2% had someone living alone who was 65 years of age or older. The average household size was 2.34.  About 61.4% of all households were families; the average family size was 3.00.

The population was distributed as 22.9% under the age of 18, 6.7% aged 18 to 24, 24.2% aged 25 to 44, 28.1% aged 45 to 64, and 18.0% who were 65 years of age or older.  The median age was 40.7 years. For every 100 females, there were 105.3 males.  For every 100 females age 18 and over, there were 102.3 males.

The 301 housing units averaged 377.8 per square mile (145.9/km2), of which 44.2% were owner-occupied, and 55.8% were occupied by renters. The homeowner vacancy rate was 2.2%; the rental vacancy rate was 11.3%;  31.0% of the population lived in owner-occupied housing units and 68.8% lived in rental housing units.

Infrastructure 
The San Simeon Community Services District provides wastewater treatment. The plant is operated by a private company under contract with the district.

References

External links 

 Chamber of Commerce
 History of San Simeon and the Hearst Family
 History of San Simeon and Sebastian store
 San Simeon pier on Photohound

Census-designated places in San Luis Obispo County, California
Populated coastal places in California
Census-designated places in California